is a railway station located in Fushimi-ku, Kyoto, Kyoto Prefecture, Japan.

The station was renamed in October 2019 to reflect the station's proximity to Ryukoku University.

Lines
Keihan Electric Railway
Keihan Main Line

Surrounding Area
 Inari Station
 Ryukoku University Fukakusa Campus and Faculty of Junior College

Adjacent stations

References

Railway stations in Kyoto